Erika Ishii is an American voice actor and host. She is best known as the voice of video game characters such as Valkyrie in Apex Legends, as well as her appearances in actual play web series including L.A. by Night and Dimension 20.

Career
Ishii's work as an actress started at a young age, with a guest appearance on Full House.

In an interview with Bungie, Ishii stated that playing The Last of Us (2013) inspired her to enter voice acting in video games. From the late 2010s, Ishii performed voice roles in numerous video games, and would ultimately contribute voice work to The Last of Us Part II in 2020. During her early career, Ishii was advised to conceal her sexuality and political views to avoid losing work. Later she became more open about her orientation and identity. Ishii indicated that doing so was a positive step, as it allowed her to be part of a community, and to take on relevant roles. "The industry is beginning to recognize the value of authenticity and inclusion. It makes for better art and it's what the majority of the world wants to see." Ishii spoke positively about her role as the mixed-Japanese lesbian Valkyrie in Apex Legends, stating that "None of it was tokenism... She's one of the most real characters I've ever had the honour of portraying."

Ishii was a host and producer for Geek & Sundry. Ishii is known for her roles in actual play role-playing web shows such as L.A. by Night and Dimension 20. In January 2023, it was announced that Ishii with Brennan Lee Mulligan, Aabria Iyengar, and Lou Wilson will star in the creator-owned actual play podcast Worlds Beyond Number; the show is scheduled to premiere in March 2023.

Ishii was a narrator for the audiobook Walk Among Us, "an audio-first trio of horror novellas set in Vampire: The Masquerades World of Darkness". Ishii has also hosted other events such as the 2018 Crunchyroll Anime Awards and the 2021 Acceleration Japan showcase. In September 2021, Ishii was a featured artist on the acoustic version of the song "Can You Feel My Love" by the music group Juniper Vale.

Personal life
Ishii is openly pansexual and genderfluid. She has been vocal in her opposition to transphobia, and she has raised funds for LGBT supporting charities such as The Trevor Project.

Filmography

Voice-over filmography

Web series

Notes

References

External links 
 

Living people
Actresses from Los Angeles
American non-binary actors
American video game actresses
American voice actresses
American LGBT people of Asian descent
Pansexual actresses
21st-century American actresses
American actresses of Japanese descent
Pansexual non-binary people
Year of birth missing (living people)